The Allgemeine Arbeiter-Union – Einheitsorganisation (AAUE or AAU-E) (English: General Workers' Union – Unified Organization) was an anti-parliamentarian council communist organisation established in Germany in October 1921. It was a split from the 
General Workers' Union of Germany (AAUD).

Otto Rühle was involved in setting up the AAUE as an organisation which combined the political and economic aspirations of communist workers in a single (einheits) organisation. This occurred following his trip to Russia as a representative of the Communist Workers' Party of Germany (KAPD) at the Second  World Congress of the Communist International. He travelled around Russia before the Congress and formed a very negative view of the Bolshevik regime. He advocated a very different way to realise a communist revolution which came to be adopted by the AAUE:

"Everyone must become in his consciousness a living bearer of the revolutionary struggle and creative member of the communist build-up. The necessary freedom therefore will however never be won in the coercive system of centralism, the chains of bureaucratic-militaristic control, under the burden of a leader-dictatorship and its inevitable accompaniments: arbitrariness, personality cult, authority, corruption, violence. Therefore transformation of the party-conception into a federative community-conception on the line of councilist ideas. Therefore: supersession of external commitments and compulsion through internal readiness and willingness.Therefore: elevation of communism from the demagogic prattle of the paper cliché to the height of one of the most internally captivating and fulfilling experiences of the whole world."

References

Communist organisations in Germany
Labor history
Labor in Germany
Council communism
Left communist organizations